San Nicolás was an 80-gun third-rate ship of the line of the Spanish Navy.

She was present at the Battle of Cape St Vincent on 14 February 1797, when she was boarded by a number of British sailors from  led by Horatio Nelson. They successfully took the ship, then crossed from her decks to board , which had come to the aid of San Nicolás, but had become encumbered with her.  Nelson and his men then captured San Josef as well.

San Nicolás was commissioned into the Royal Navy as HMS San Nicolas.  She became a prison ship in 1800, and was sold for breaking up on 3 November 1814.

References

External links
 

Ships of the line of the Spanish Navy
Ships of the line of the Royal Navy